The 2012 World Junior Short Track Speed Skating Championships took place between 24 and 26 February in Melbourne, Australia at the Medibank Icehouse. This is the first time which the Championship was held during the summer and in the Southern Hemisphere. The World Championships are organised by the ISU which also run world cups and championships in speed skating and figure skating.

Medal summary

Medal table

Men's events

Women's events

Participating nations 
Athletes from 28 countries participated in these championships, which is a decrease of five nations from the last year's competition. Malaysia and Singapore made their debut appearance.

See also
Short track speed skating
World Junior Short Track Speed Skating Championships

References

External links
Official website
Results book

World Junior Short Track Speed Skating Championships
World Junior Short Track Speed Skating Championships
World Junior Short Track Speed Skating Championships
International sports competitions hosted by Australia
Sports competitions in Melbourne
2010s in Melbourne
World Junior Short Track Speed Skating Championships
World Junior Short Track Speed Skating